Taktsang Monastery is a prominent Tibetan Buddhist sacred site and temple complex, located on the cliffside of the Tawang District in the Indian state of Arunachal Pradesh (not the same as Paro Taktsang monastery).

The monastery is perched on the ridge of a hillock surrounded by a dense coniferous forest and lofty mountains. The monastery has three tiers, each dedicated to a Tibetan guru or god. The monastery is a 5 km drive from the popular tourist destination Madhuri Lake (also known as Sungester Lake). Guests can visit Tirth yatra and locations nearby where Guru Padmasambhava is said to have meditated. Visitors can trek down the stairs at the back of the main complex to visit the lair of Guru Padmasambhava.

See also
Paro Taktsang (spa phro stag tshang / spa gro stag tshang), the popular name of Taktsang Palphug Monastery

References

Tibetan Buddhist monasteries
Buddhist monasteries in Arunachal Pradesh
Buddhist temples in India